The Detwiler House, at 310 N. Alarcon in Prescott, Arizona, was built around 1900.  It was listed on the National Register of Historic Places in 1978.

History 

It is significant as the home of J.S. "Whistling Jack" Detwiler and his family.  Detwiler was a well-known railroad engineer on the Santa Fe, Prescott and Phoenix Railway.  It was later home of the parents of Ernest Love (1895–1918), a local World War I hero, namesake of Ernest A. Love Field.

References

External links

National Register of Historic Places in Prescott, Arizona
Houses completed in 1900